Bert Alford Cassidy (May 19, 1889 - January 20, 1950) served in the California Senate for the 3rd District from 1929 to 1933 and during World War I he served in the United States Army.

References

Republican Party California state senators
United States Army personnel of World War I
20th-century American politicians
1889 births
1950 deaths